is a district located in Nagano Prefecture, Japan.

Population
As of February 1, 2006, the district has an estimated population of 12,039. The total area is now down to 241.04 km2.

There are only one town and one village left in the district: Aoki and Nagawa.

History

January 14, 1879 - Due to the district, ward, town and village status enforcement, the district seat was located at the town of Ueda.
April 1, 1889 - Due to enforcing the town and village status, Chiisagata District formed the towns of Ueda, Nagakuboshin, and Nagakubofuru, and 32 villages (3 towns, 32 villages)
October 30, 1912 - The village of Maruko gained town status. (4 towns, 31 villages)
May 1, 1919 - The town of Ueda gained city status which lasted until March 6, 2006. (3 towns, 31 villages)
September 10, 1921 -  (-)  The village of Sakashita merged into the city of Ueda. (3 towns, 30 villages)
September 1, 1949 - The villages of Higashishiota and Fujisan merged to form the village of Higashishiota. (3 towns, 29 villages)
October 1, 1953 - The village of Sagata gained town status and changed the name to Tanaka. (4 towns, 28 villages)
April 1, 1954 -  (-)  The villages of Shiojiri and Kawabe merged into the city of Ueda (4 towns, 26 villages)
October 1, 1954 - The villages of Higashiuchi and Nishiuchi merged into the town of Maruko (4 towns, 24 villages)
April 1, 1955 - The villages of Yoda and Nagase merged into the town of Maruko. (4 towns, 22 villages)
May 1, 1956 - The villages of Nishishiota, Bessho, Higashishiota, and Nakashiota merged to form the town of Shiota. (5 towns, 18 villages)
September 30, 1956 (4 towns, 11 villages)
The town of Tanaka and the villages Netsu and Wa merged to form the town of Tōbu.
The village of Toyosato and Tonoshiro merged to form the village of Toyotono.
The towns of Nakakuboshin and Nakakubofuru and the village of Daimon merged to form the town of Nagato.
 (-)  The villages of Kamigawa and Izumida merged into the city of Ueda.
The village of Shiokawa merged into the town of Maruko
March 31, 1957 (4 towns, 10 villages)
Parts of the village of Urazato merged into the village of Aoki.
The village of Muroga and the remaining parts of the village of Urazaro merged to form the village of Kawanishi.
August 1, 1957 -  (-)  The village of Kamishina merged into the city of Ueda (4 towns, 9 villages)
April 1, 1958 -  (-)  The village of Toyotono merged into the city of Ueda (4 towns, 8 villages)
April 10, 1958 - The village of Shino merged into the town of Tōbu. (4 towns, 7 villages)
October 1, 1958 - The villages of Naga, Hoyo, and Motohara merged to form the town of Sanada. (5 towns, 4 villages)
April 1, 1959 -  (-)  Parts of the town of Tōbu was merged into the city of Komoro.
April 1, 1970 -  (-)  The town of Shiota was merged into the city of Ueda.(4 towns, 4 villages)
April 1, 1973 -  (-)  The village of Kawanishi was merged into the city of Ueda.(4 towns, 3 villages)
April 1, 2004 -  (-)  The town of Tōbu merged with the village of Kitamimaki from Kitasaku District to form the new city of Tōmi.(3 towns, 3 villages)
October 1, 2005 - The town of Nagato and the village of Wada merged to form the new town of Nagawa.(3 towns, 2 villages)
March 6, 2006 -  (-)  The towns of Maruko and Sanada, and the village of Takeshi merged with the city of Ueda to create the new city of Ueda.(1 town, 1 village)

Notes
  (+)  - The district gained land.
  (-)  - The district lost land.

References

Districts in Nagano Prefecture